Timmy Lourie Finseth (born January 7, 1964) is an American politician in the state of Minnesota. He served in the Minnesota House of Representatives.

References

Republican Party members of the Minnesota House of Representatives
People from Polk County, Minnesota
1964 births
Living people